The Roman Catholic Diocese of Samoa–Pago Pago (Latin: Diœcesis Samoa–Pagopagensis) is a Latin suffragan diocese of the Roman Catholic Church in the United States overseas dependency of American Samoa, in the ecclesiastical province of the Metropolitan Roman Catholic Archdiocese of Samoa–Apia. 
 
The ordinary is a bishop whose seat is the Cathedral of the Holy Family in the Tafuna. He is also pastor of the co-cathedral of Saint Joseph the Worker in Fagatogo.

On Friday, May 31, 2013, Pope Francis accepted the resignation of Bishop John Quinn Weitzel M.M., and appointed the Rev. Peter Brown, C.Ss.R., the Regional Superior of the Congregation of the Most Holy Redeemer also known as the Redemptorist Congregation in New Zealand as bishop-elect of the diocese of Samoa–Pago Pago. Brown was ordained as a bishop on August 22, 2013.

History 
It was canonically erected on 10 September 1982, from a unified diocese of Samoa and Tokelau, the bulk of which became its present Metropolitan.

It enjoyed a Papal visit from Pope Paul VI in November 1970.

Episcopal ordinaries

Bishops
 Cardinal Pio Taofinuʻu, S.M., Apostolic Administrator (1982–1986)
 John Quinn Weitzel, M.M. (1986–2013)
 Peter Brown, C.Ss.R. (2013–present)

Coadjutor bishop
 Kolio Etuale (2022-present)

Coat of arms 
The proposal of coat of arms was created by Marek Sobola, a heraldic specialist from Slovakia. The colors of the new coat of arms are derived from the national colors of American Samoa. The heraldic figures on the coat of arms include a bald eagle (the national symbol) and gold and silver lily - symbols of Pope Paul VI and John Paul II. These two popes contributed to the development of the diocese.

See also 

 Catholic Church by country
 Catholic Church in the United States
 Ecclesiastical Province of Samoa-Apia
 Global organisation of the Catholic Church
 List of Catholic dioceses (alphabetical) (including archdioceses)
 List of Catholic dioceses (structured view) (including archdioceses)
 List of the Catholic dioceses of the United States
 List of Roman Catholic archdioceses (by country and continent)

References

Sources and external links
 Roman Catholic Diocese of Samoa–Pago Pago Official Site
 GCatholic, with incumbent bio links
 Catholic Hierarchy Profile of the Diocese of Samoa–Pago Pago

Roman Catholic dioceses in American Samoa
Samoa-Pago-Pago
Catholic Church in American Samoa
Roman Catholic Ecclesiastical Province of Samoa–Apia
Christian organizations established in 1982
Roman Catholic dioceses and prelatures established in the 20th century
1982 establishments in American Samoa
Religious organizations based in American Samoa